The president of Fudan University is the chief executive officer of Fudan University, and, essentially, the leader of the university. Each is appointed by and is responsible to the Central Committee of the Chinese Communist Party and the State Council, who delegate to him or her the day-to-day running of the university.

Fudan University, was set up in 1905, and its first president, was Ma Xiangbo, a Chinese Jesuit priest, scholar and educator, he also founded the Aurora University.

The university's current president is Jin Li, who is also a fellow of the Chinese Academy of Sciences.

Presidents of Fudan University

Chinese Communist Party secretaries of Fudan University

References

External links
 
 
 

 
Fudan University